Erik Jonsson may refer to:

 J. Erik Jonsson (1901–1995), American businessman and mayor of Dallas, Texas
 Erik Jonsson (sport shooter) (1873–1958), Swedish sports shooter
  (born 1976), Swedish archer